Rock Pit is the fourth album by High and Mighty Color. The album was released in Japan on March 19, 2008 following two singles.

Overview 
Rock Pit was the first time that all the previous single A-sides are not collected into a following album. "Dreams", the 10th single from the band, was used on the best album, 10 Color Singles. Rock Pit contains three new versions of their previous singles, "Amazing" and "Flashback/Komorebi no Uta", as well as the cover of Luna Sea's song "Rosier". The third track of the album, "Toxic", was used as the theme song for the PlayStation 2 game Warriors Orochi: Rebirth of the Demon Lord.

The album peaked at #24 on the Weekly Oricon with 6,767 copies sold in its first week and charted for approximately four weeks.

Track listing
CD

DVD
 High and Mighty Color Show Time

Personnel
 Mākii – vocals
 Yuusuke – vocals
 Meg – guitars
 Kazuto – guitars
 Sassy – drums
 Mackaz – bass

References

High and Mighty Color albums
2008 albums